The North Idaho Centennial Trail is a  paved trail in Idaho used for transportation and recreational activities. Extending from Higgens Point on the northeast side of Lake Coeur d'Alene, a popular place for bald eagle watchers in early winter, the trail follows the lake's north shoreline to the Spokane River where it follows it to the Idaho/Washington border. On the other side of the state border, the trail becomes the Spokane River Centennial Trail and extends for another  out to Sontag Park in Nine Mile Falls, Washington. The trail passes through the towns of Post Falls, Idaho and Coeur d'Alene, Idaho.

History

Following the World's Fair and Expo '74 in Spokane, Washington, the Washington state Parks and Recreation Commission started planning a trail along the Spokane River to celebrate their state's centennial in 1989. Coordination began with Idaho to extend the trail past the border and the northeast side of Lake Coeur d'Alene to celebrate Idaho's centennial as well in 1990. In 1999 Hillary Clinton made it into a Millennium Legacy Trail. In 2002 local artist David Clemons designed and installed two statues to sit at either end of the trail. "Leopold", an 1890 photographer, sits at Higgens Point and "Kate", a turn of the 20th century bicyclist sat at the state border. Clemons' concept was to capture individuals 100 years ago enjoying the same activities on the trail as they do today. In 2003, "Kate" was vandalized and had to be taken back for repairs. In 2005 she was reinstated on the trail at Riverstone Park, at the beginning of the Spokane River.

References

External links
 Official Site

Hiking trails in Idaho
Protected areas of Kootenai County, Idaho
Post Falls, Idaho